Luis Enrique Quiñones (born 26 June 1991) is a Colombian professional footballer who plays as a winger for Liga MX club Tigres UANL.

Career statistics

International career
Quiñones was named in Colombia's provisional squad for Copa América Centenario but was cut from the final squad.

Honours
UANL
Liga MX: Apertura 2016, Clausura 2019
CONCACAF Champions League: 2020

Individual
CONCACAF Champions League Team of the Tournament: 2019, 2020
Liga MX All-Star: 2022

References

1991 births
Living people
Colombian footballers
Categoría Primera A players
Liga MX players
Patriotas Boyacá footballers
Águilas Doradas Rionegro players
Atlético Junior footballers
Independiente Santa Fe footballers
Club Universidad Nacional footballers
Tigres UANL footballers
Footballers from Cali
Colombian expatriate footballers
Expatriate footballers in Mexico
Colombian expatriate sportspeople in Mexico
Association football forwards